Galle electoral district is one of the 22 multi-member electoral districts of Sri Lanka created by the 1978 Constitution of Sri Lanka. The district is conterminous with the administrative district of Galle in the Southern province. The district currently elects 10 of the 225 members of the Sri Lankan Parliament and had 761,815 registered electors in 2010.

1982 Presidential Election
Results of the 1st presidential election held on 20 October 1982 for the district:

1988 Presidential Election
Results of the 2nd presidential election held on 19 December 1988 for the district:

1989 Parliamentary General Election
Results of the 9th parliamentary election held on 15 February 1989 for the district:

The following candidates were elected:
Amarasiri Dodangoda (SLFP), 66,431 preference votes (pv); Bentota Pathiranage Richard de Silva (SLFP), 64,268 pv; Matarage Upali Sarath Danston Amarasiri (UNP), 63,985 pv; Rupa Karunathilake (UNP), 51,147 pv; Don Ranjith Nanda Kumarage (UNP), 43,609 pv; Vincent Jayawardene (UNP), 42,085 pv; Hemakumara Nanayakkara (SLFP), 37,310 pv; Kariyawasam Haputhanthri Gamage Noel Padmasiri (SLFP), 35,772 pv; Piyasena Gamage (SLFP); 35,456 pv; Rannulu Nandimiththa G. de Soyza (UNP); 28,474 pv; and Buddhika Kurukularatne (UNP), 24,010 pv.

1993 Provincial Council Election
Results of the 2nd Southern provincial council election held on 17 May 1993 for the district:

1994 Provincial Council Election
Results of the 3rd Southern provincial council election held on 24 March 1994 for the district:

1994 Parliamentary General Election
Results of the 10th parliamentary election held on 16 August 1994 for the district:

The following candidates were elected:
Amarasiri Dodangoda (PA), 176,151 preference votes (pv); Richard Bentota Pathirana (PA), 116,893 pv; Vajira Abeywardena (UNP), 81,373 pv; Piyasena Gamage (PA), 67,033 pv; Ganegama Liyanage Sarath Gunawardena (UNP), 56,568 pv; Amarasiri Matarage Upali Sarath Dunstan (UNP), 53,577 pv; Rupa Karunathilake (UNP), 52,577 pv; Kariyawasam Haputhanthri Gamage Noel Padmasiri (PA), 52,370 pv; Kalu Arachchige Nandadasa Gunasinghe (PA), 46,948 pv; and Asoka Weerasinghe de Silva (PA), 45,022 pv.

1994 Presidential Election
Results of the 3rd presidential election held on 9 November 1994 for the district:

1999 Provincial Council Election
Results of the 4th Southern provincial council election held on 10 June 1999 for the district:

1999 Presidential Election
Results of the 4th presidential election held on 21 December 1999 for the district:

2000 Parliamentary General Election
Results of the 11th parliamentary election held on 10 October 2000 for the district:

The following candidates were elected:
Richard Pathirana (PA), 114,658 preference votes (pv); Vajira Abeywardena (UNP), 104,483 pv; Amarasiri Dodangoda (PA), 89,149 pv; Hemakumara Nanayakkara (UNP), 70,231 pv; Piyasena Gamage (PA), 62,830 pv; Gayantha Karunathilaka (UNP), 60,728 pv; A.A. Keerthi Suranjith Mawellage (PA), 51,899 pv; G. L. Sarath Gunawardena (UNP), 46,656 pv; Kariyawasam Haputhanthri Gamage Noel Padmasiri (PA), 46,600 pv; and Athula Indika Weerakoon (JVP), 2,664 pv.

2001 Parliamentary General Election
Results of the 12th parliamentary election held on 5 December 2001 for the district:

The following candidates were elected:
Vajira Abeywardena (UNF), 110,055 preference votes (pv); Amarasiri Dodangoda (PA), 78,697 pv; Hemakumara Nanayakkara (UNF), 78,590 pv; Richard Pathirane (PA), 72,737 pv; Gayantha Karunathilaka (UNF), 64,257 pv; Piyasena Gamage (PA), 54,570 pv; Ananda Abeywickrama (UNF), 50,772 pv; Jayantha Jayaweera (UNF), 49,667 pv; Baddegama Samitha (PA), 42,120 pv; and Athula Indika Weerakoon (JVP), 2,938 pv.

2004 Parliamentary General Election
Results of the 13th parliamentary election held on 2 April 2004 for the district:

The following candidates were elected:
Ajith Kumara (UPFA-JVP), 128,060 preference votes (pv); Vajira Abeywardena (UNF-UNP), 126,037 pv; Chandrasena Wijesinghe (UPFA-JVP), 101,377 pv; Thilakaratne Withanachchi (UPFA-JVP) 85,627 pv; Hemakumara Nanayakkara (UNF-UNP), 81,382 pv; Piyasena Gamage (UPFA-SLFP), 71,307 pv; Amarasiri Dodangoda (UPFA-SLFP), 60,282 pv; Gunaratna Weerakoon (UPFA-SLFP), 58,154 pv; Gayantha Karunathilaka (UNF-UNP), 55,757 pv; and Lionel Premasiri (UNF-UNP), 39,519 pv.

Amarasiri Dodangoda (UPFA-SLFP) died on 30 May 2009. His replacement Chandima Weerakkody (UPFA-SLFP) was sworn in on 9 June 2009.

2004 Provincial Council Election
Results of the 5th Southern provincial council election held on 10 July 2004 for the district:

The following candidates were elected:
Shan Wijayalal De Silva (UPFA), 59,826 preference votes (pv); Ariyathilaka Udalamattha Gamage Dayawansha (UPFA), 39,725 pv; Nishantha Muthuhettigamage (UPFA), 36,274 pv; Thithagalla Gamage Rathna (UPFA), 35,714 pv; Kolamba Thantreege Nishantha Perera (UPFA), 33,370 pv; Asela Naleenda Lal Naligama Hewage (UPFA), 33,008 pv; Kalinga Samithra De Silva (UPFA), 32,483 pv; Thotagamuwe Kankanmge Jayasundara (UPFA), 29,690 pv; Agampodi Mohan P. De Silva (UPFA), 29,103 pv; Iranipala Wijewantha (UPFA), 29,076 pv; Jayaweera Thommaya Hakuru (UPFA), 27,790 pv; Lal Bandula Bandarigoda (UNP), 24,675 pv; Abewickrama Ananda (UNP), 23,885 pv; Manusha Nanayakkara (UNP), 21,774 pv; Dhasilige Sunil Senanayaka (UNP), 21,731 pv; Wijepala Hettiarachchi (UNP), 21,675 pv; Asoka Dhanawansa De Silva Pettagam (UNP), 21,154 pv; Kaluarachchige Nanda Gunasinghe (UPFA), 21,068 pv; Angulugaha Gamage Chandradasa Piyasiri (UPFA), 21,051 pv; Sathendra Maithree Gunarathna (UNP), 20,503 pv; Ajith De Silva Ginihalgodage Ramba (UPFA), 19,780 pv; Ranjith Kumarage (UNP), 17,951 pv; and Jayasiri Nanayakkara (UNP), 16,550 pv.

2005 Presidential Election
Results of the 5th presidential election held on 17 November 2005 for the district:

2009 Provincial Council Election
Results of the 6th Southern provincial council election held on 10 October 2009 for the district:

The following candidates were elected:
Shan Wijayalal De Silva (UPFA), 90,294 preference votes (pv); Ihala Medagama Randima Preemal Gamage (UPFA), 77,418 pv; Nishantha Muthuhettigamage (UPFA), 71,718 pv; Sajin Vass Gunawardena (UPFA), 70,627 pv; Udalamatta Gamage Dayawansha Ariyathilaka (UPFA), 56,353 pv; A. Krishantha Pushpakumara Weerasinghe alias "Raththaran" (UNP), 52,371 pv; Agampodi Mohan P. De Silva (UPFA), 48,272 pv; Athukorala Kariyawasam Chaminda Sampath (UPFA), 42,300 pv; Ajith Prasanna Hewa Aluthsal Arachchige (UPFA), 38,762 pv; Manusha Nanayakkara (UNP), 38,477 pv; Angulugaha Gamage Chandradasa Piyasiri (UPFA), 30,678 pv; Anarkalli Aakarsha Jayatilaka (UPFA), 26,728 pv; Bandula Lal Bandarigoda (UNP), 24,891 pv; Baddegama Samitha (UPFA), 24,815 pv; T.D.S.L. Jayaweera (UPFA), 24,466 pv; Ananda Padmasiri Kariyawasam (UPFA), 24,206 pv; Amarapala Kahandapeelage (UPFA), 24,010 pv; Withanachchi Don Chamli Padmalal (UPFA), 22,771 pv; Lasantha Wijitha Kumara Wijenayaka (UPFA), 22,399 pv; Asoka Dhanawansa De Silva Pettagam (UNP), 21,674 pv; Wijepala Bopagoda Hettiarachchige (UNP), 19,470 pv; A. Akarawitage Gunarathna Maiththree (UNP), 17,920 pv; and Asela Naleenda Lal Naligama Hewage (JVP), 3,113 pv.

2010 Presidential Election
Results of the 6th presidential election held on 26 January 2010 for the district:

2010 Parliamentary General Election
Results of the 14th parliamentary election held on 8 April 2010 for the district:

The following candidates were elected:
Nishantha Muthuhettigama (UPFA), 125,777 preference votes (pv); Ramesh Pathirana (UPFA), 95,313 pv; Gunaratna Weerakoon (UPFA-SLFP), 68,629 pv; Chandima Weerakkody (UPFA-SLFP), 67,231 pv; Piyasena Gamage (UPFA-SLFP), 67,033 pv; Sajin Vass Gunawardena (UPFA), 53,989 pv; Gayantha Karunathilaka (UNF-UNP), 49,945 pv; Manusha Nanayakkara (UNF), 49,690 pv; Mohan Priyadarshana Silva (UPFA), 49,456 pv; and Ajith Kumara (DNA-JVP), 15,872 pv.

2015 Presidential election

Polling Divisions
The Galle Electoral District is made up of the following Polling Divisions
Akmeemana
Ambalangoda
Baddegama
Balapitiya
Bentara Elpitiya
Galle
Habaraduwa
Hiniduma
Karandeniya
Ratgama

References

Electoral districts of Sri Lanka
Politics of Galle District